This is a list of films that were shot at the MGM-British Studios, Borehamwood, England, one of several sites collectively known as "Elstree Studios". The studios were built in 1935, but were not used for filming until they were bought by Metro-Goldwyn-Mayer (MGM) in 1944. The studios were used for MGM productions, but were also rented to many other production companies. The studios closed in 1970 and were demolished soon after.

The list includes feature films for which some or all scenes were shot at the MGM-British studios. It also includes television series for which some or all scenes (of some or all episodes) were shot on film at the studios.

1947–1959

1960–1964

1965–1970

See also
 Lists of productions shot at the other Elstree studios:
 List of films and television shows shot at Elstree Studios (Shenley Road)
 List of films and television shows shot at Clarendon Road Studios

References

MGM-British Studios, Elstree
MGM-British Studios, Elstree
 List of films shot at MGM-British Studios, Elstree